The black-faced quailfinch (Ortygospiza atricollis atricollis), is a common subspecies of estrildid finch found in western and central of Africa.  Some taxonomists consider it to be conspecific with the African quailfinch, others consider all three species to be conspecific.

Origin
Origin and phylogeny has been obtained by Antonio Arnaiz-Villena et al. Estrildinae may have originated in India and dispersed thereafter (towards Africa and Pacific Ocean habitats).

References

BirdLife Species Factsheet

External links
 Quail Finch/Black-faced quailfinch - Species text in The Atlas of Southern African Birds.
 African Quailfinch (Ortygospiza atricollis) - Species page in Handbook of the Birds of the World Alive

black-faced quailfinch
Birds of Sub-Saharan Africa
black-faced quailfinch
Taxa named by Louis Jean Pierre Vieillot